The women's 800 metre freestyle competition of the 2014 FINA World Swimming Championships (25 m) was held on 4 December.

Records
Prior to the competition, the existing world and championship records were as follows.

The following records were established during the competition:

Results

Final
The final was held at 19:42.

*Raced in slower heats.

References

Women's 800 metre freestyle
2014 in women's swimming